Rizwan Mosque is an Ahmadi Muslim mosque in Portland, in the US state of Oregon. It was opened in 1987, making it the first and oldest mosque built in Portland. It is operated by the Portland chapter.

References

Ahmadiyya mosques in the United States
Religious buildings and structures in Oregon
Religious buildings and structures in Portland, Oregon
Mosques completed in 1987
Mosques in Oregon
1987 establishments in Oregon